The Birds or The Two Birds is a monumental 1952-1953 ceiling painting by Georges Braque in the Salle Henri II in the Louvre, which had to be renovated at that time. He was commissioned by Georges Salles, director of the museums of France. It was unveiled in 1953. The artist succeeded in scaling an intimate theme dear to him up to a monumental scale. He resolved the problem posed by the vast canvas by using large blocks of colour, giving the work as a whole strength and simplicity.

Birds in Braque's work

Production

Reception

Bibliography 
  Bernard Zurcher, Braque vie et œuvre, Fribourg, Office du livre, 1988, 315 p. (ISBN 2-09-284742-2)
  Nicole Worms de Romilly, Braque, le cubisme : fin 1907-1914, Paris, Adrien Maeght, 1982, 308 p. (ISBN 2-85587-100-X)
  Jean-Louis Ferrier, Yann Le Pichon, L'Aventure de l'art au xxe siècle, Paris, éditions du Chêne-Hachette, 1988, 898 p. (ISBN 2-85108-509-3) préface de Pontus Hultén
  André Verdet, Georges Braque, Éditions Galilée, 1988, 211 p. (ISBN 978-2-7186-0099-4), première édition en 1956, éditeur René Kister, Genève, Suisse
  Alex Danchev, Georges Braque, le défi silencieux, Éditions Hazan, 2013, 367 p. (ISBN 978-2-7541-0701-3) (First edition, 2005, Penguin Books, in English; translated into French by Jean-François Allain.
  Jean-Louis Ferrier, Yann Le Pichon, L'Aventure de l'art au xxe siècle, Paris, éditions du Chêne-Hachette, 1988, 898 p. (ISBN 2-85108-509-3) préface de Pontus Hultén
  Collectif RMN, Braque, l'expo, Paris, Réunion des musées nationaux et du Grand Palais des Champs-Élysées, 2013, 368 p. (ISBN 978-2-7118-6109-5). Catalogue de l'exposition dans les Galeries nationales du Grand Palais (Paris) en partenariat avec le Centre Pompidou, Paris, et le Musée des beaux-arts de Houston (MFAH), Houston, Texas 
  Jean Leymarie, Braque : f'', Genève, Skira-Fabbri, 1967, 134 p.Document utilisé pour la rédaction de l’article

References

Paintings by Georges Braque
1952 paintings
1953 paintings
Paintings in the Louvre by French artists
Birds in art